Katarina (Katra) Zajc (born January 31, 1967) is a law professor at the University of Ljubljana, and a former alpine skier from Slovenia.

Zajc graduated from University of Ljubljana, where she earned her bachelor's degree in law. She continued her studies in the USA, where she received an LLM degree from Yale Law School and a PhD in economics from George Mason University. At George Mason University, she received a Snavely Award for being the best PhD student in economics.

Zajc is currently an associate professor at the University of Ljubljana, where she is a member of the Chair of Law and Economics. In 2009, she started a six-year member term on the Judicial Council of Slovenia. In 2009-10, Zajc was a visiting professor at Utrecht University, Netherlands. Earlier in her career, she was also an arbiter at the Permanent Arbitrage at the Slovenian Chamber of Commerce, a lecturer at the Police Academy in Slovenia, a research and teaching assistant at George Mason University, USA, and a researcher at the Vienna Institute for Comparative Economic Studies, Austria.

In 1988, she represented Yugoslavia as an alpine skier in the Winter Olympics in Calgary, Canada.

World Cup results

Season standings

Race podiums

References

External links
 sports-reference.com

1967 births
Living people
Slovenian female alpine skiers
Olympic alpine skiers of Yugoslavia
Alpine skiers at the 1988 Winter Olympics
University of Ljubljana alumni
Slovenian women lawyers
Yale Law School alumni
George Mason University alumni
20th-century Slovenian economists
Academic staff of the University of Ljubljana
20th-century Slovenian lawyers
21st-century Slovenian lawyers
21st-century Slovenian economists